R. K. Law College is a private law school situated at Bari Brahmana, Vijaypur, Samba district in the Indian union territory of Jammu and Kashmir. It offers undergraduate 3 years law courses, 5 Year Integrated LL.B. courses, approved by Bar Council of India (BCI), New Delhi and affiliated to University of Jammu.

History
R. K. Law College was established in 2009 by the R. K. Society for Urban and Rural Development.

Facilities 

 Hostels
 Library
 Cafeteria
 Computer Lab
 Auditorium

References

Educational institutions established in 2009
2009 establishments in Jammu and Kashmir
Law schools in Jammu and Kashmir